Kevin Dudley Pearce (born 29 February 1960 in Devonport, Tasmania) is an Australian former cricketer who played one first-class cricket match for the Tasmanian Tigers.

External links
 
 

1960 births
Living people
Tasmania cricketers
Australian cricketers
People from Devonport, Tasmania
Cricketers from Tasmania
20th-century Australian people